Kim Yoo-ri (born August 29, 1984) is a South Korean actress.

Career
She starred in the television dramas Cheongdam-dong Alice (2012) and Master's Sun (2013).

In September 2018, Kim signed with new management agency C-JeS Entertainment.

Filmography

Television series

Film

Music video

Awards and nominations

References

External links

Living people
1984 births
South Korean television actresses
People from Busan
South Korean film actresses